Northland Preparatory Academy is a public charter high school and middle school in Flagstaff, Arizona. It aims to provide a college preparatory environment and alternative to public high schools in the area.
The courses include various regular, AP, and honors classes, which include World History, American history, Geography, Mathematics, English, Psychology, and various sciences.

Accolades 

Northland Preparatory Academy is currently the 435th ranked high school in the nation, as well as the 16th ranked high school in Arizona. NPA is also the 469th best school in Arizona.

References

Public high schools in Arizona
Charter schools in Arizona
Public middle schools in Arizona
Schools in Coconino County, Arizona